A Claim of Right for Scotland was a document crafted by the Campaign for a Scottish Assembly in 1988, declaring the sovereignty of the Scottish people. It was signed by all then-serving Labour and Liberal Democrat MPs, with the exception of Tam Dalyell (Labour), a strident opponent of devolution. The list of signatories included several MPs who would later attain high office, including future prime minister Gordon Brown, future chancellor Alistair Darling, and future leaders of the Liberal Democrats Charles Kennedy and Menzies Campbell.

The Claim of Right was signed at the General Assembly Hall, on the Mound in Edinburgh - on 30 March 1989 by 58 of Scotland's 72 Members of Parliament, 7 of Scotland's 8 MEPs, 59 out of 65 Scottish regional, district and island councils, and numerous political parties, churches and other civic organisations, e.g., trade unions. 

The Claim was part of a process which led to devolution of powers from the Parliament of the United Kingdom to a new Scottish Parliament in 1999. Its title was a reference to the Claim of Right Act 1689, an Act of the Parliament of Scotland which limited the power of the Scottish monarch (at the time, William III and Mary II) in much the same manner as the English Bill of Rights passed the same year.

In October 2011 the Scottish Government announced that the Claim of Right would be brought before the Scottish Parliament to allow MSPs to re-endorse the claims of the sovereignty of the Scottish people. The Claim of Right was debated in the Scottish Parliament on 26 January 2012.

Text of the Claim

The Claim of Right reads-

Legal significance
The Claim of Right has never had or claimed any legal force.

Debate in the House of Commons 
On 4 July 2018, the House of Commons debated the Claim of Right in an Opposition Day debate selected by the SNP, this motion noted that the people of Scotland are sovereign and that they have the right to determine the best form of government for Scotland's needs. 

This was a non-binding debate and did not create any legal recognition of the Claim of Right or have any legal significance.

See also
Claim of Right Act 1689
Popular sovereignty
Scottish Covenant Association
Scots law

References

1989 in politics
1989 in Scotland
Collective rights
Home rule in the United Kingdom
Political charters
Political history of Scotland
Popular sovereignty
Proclamations
1989 documents